Manas Vidyalaya is a co-educational school in Jehanabad in Bihar in India that educates students up to the  10+2 level. It is run by the Nav Mahabodhi and Welfare Charitable Trust, which is headed by Dr. Nawal Kishore, recipient of the Rashtriya Shiksha Ratan Award by the Indian Economic Development and Research Association (IEDRA).

The school has four branches in Jehanabad, Babhana, Walidad and Kaler. It was the first CBSE accredited school in Jehanabad district. The school has a large campus with modern facilities. The school organizes excursions every year for students.

The school publishes its magazine "Manas Prabha " every year on annual day.  School alumni include Major Sumit Sharma of the Indian Army, Himanshu Singh of the Indian Police Service and Nitin Sharma at the Massachusetts Institute of Technology.

References

External links 
 Manas Vidyalaya

Jehanabad
Schools in Bihar
Educational institutions in India with year of establishment missing